Subcommittee on Oversight and Investigations may refer to many of several United States Congressional subcommittees:

 United States House Armed Services Subcommittee on Oversight and Investigations
 United States House Energy Subcommittee on Oversight and Investigations
 United States House Financial Services Subcommittee on Oversight and Investigations
 United States House Foreign Affairs Subcommittee on Oversight and Investigations
 United States House Homeland Security Subcommittee on Management, Investigations, and Oversight
 United States House Intelligence Subcommittee on Oversight and Investigations
 United States House Science Subcommittee on Investigations and Oversight
 United States House Small Business Subcommittee on Investigations and Oversight
 United States House Veterans' Affairs Subcommittee on Oversight and Investigations

See also 
 United States House Committee on Oversight and Government Reform
 United States Senate Homeland Security Subcommittee on Financial and Contracting Oversight